The Pont du Diable de Villemagne-l'Argentière is a romanesque bridge in Villemagne-l'Argentière, in the Hérault department in France. It crosses the river Mare. It is built at a slope due to the different levels of the banks of the Mare.

History 
The bridge dates from the 13th century. It was built to allow the shipping of coal and lignite from Graissessac to the royal glassworks at Hérépian.

Protection 
The bridge was protected as a historic monument on the 27 May 1936. It is the property of the commune.

References 

Bridges completed in the 18th century
Diable
Monuments historiques of Hérault
Transport in Occitania (administrative region)
Tourist attractions in Hérault
18th-century architecture in France